Tiago André Ramos da Mota (born 20 May 1987) is a Portuguese football player who plays for Sacavenense.

Club career
He made his professional debut in the Segunda Liga for Oriental on 9 August 2014 in a game against Santa Clara.

In 2019, he signed with Sacavenense.

References

External links
Tiago Mota at ZeroZero

1987 births
Footballers from Lisbon
Living people
Portuguese footballers
Clube Oriental de Lisboa players
Campeonato de Portugal (league) players
Liga Portugal 2 players
Association football goalkeepers
S.U. 1º Dezembro players